The 2020 United States presidential election in Tennessee was held on Tuesday, November 3, 2020, as part of the 2020 United States presidential election in which all 50 states plus the District of Columbia participated. Tennessee voters chose electors to represent them in the Electoral College via a popular vote, pitting the Republican Party's nominee, incumbent President Donald Trump, and running mate Vice President Mike Pence against Democratic Party nominee, former Vice President Joe Biden, and his running mate California Senator Kamala Harris. Tennessee has 11 electoral votes in the Electoral College.

Trump won Tennessee with 60.66% of the vote, almost tied with his 60.72% vote share in 2016. Despite this, Biden got 37.4% of the vote, three points better than Hillary Clinton. Prior to the election, all 17 news organizations considered this a state Trump would win, or a safe red state. The Volunteer State has not supported a Democrat for president since 1996. Biden won the same counties as Clinton did: urban Shelby and Davidson counties—anchored by Memphis and Nashville, respectively—as well as majority-Black Haywood County. In addition, Trump performed somewhat better than polls anticipated, as they had Trump leading Biden by 55%–41%. He also became the first Democrat to win the presidency without Hardeman County.

Despite this, Biden was able to improve his support in the Nashville metropolitan area, gaining 64.5% of the vote in Davidson County, the best Democratic performance in the county since FDR won 72.1% of the vote in 1944. At the same time, Biden also made gains in the Nashville suburban counties of Williamson, Rutherford, Wilson, Sumner, and Cheatham, performing considerably better than Hillary Clinton in 2016. For example, Biden lost Rutherford County, anchored by Murfreesboro, only by 56.6% to 41.2%, much lower than Clinton's 25.9-point loss in 2016. Additionally, he narrowed Trump's margins in Hamilton County—anchored by Chattanooga—only losing it by 9.7 points, the best Democratic performance there since Bill Clinton lost the county by 6.5% in 1996; and with 44.1% of the popular vote, the best Democratic percentage since Carter's 48% in 1976, consequently losing by 2.8 points. This is the first time a Democrat has even garnered 40% of the vote in Rutherford County since 2000, when favorite son Al Gore lost the county by 9.7 points while at the same time losing both his home state and the election.

Winning the state by 708,764 votes, Tennessee gave Trump his largest margin of victory by the number of votes nationally. This exceeded the 631,221 vote margin he won in Texas, marking the first time since 1988 (when Florida provided the largest margin of victory) where Texas did not provide the Republican presidential nominee with his widest margin of votes for a statewide victory. Additionally, this is the second consecutive election in which a nominee carried over 60% of Tennessee's vote, the first time since 1996 that Tennessee and neighboring Georgia did not vote for the same candidate, and the first time since 1980 that Tennessee was won by the Republicans while Georgia was won by the Democrats.

Per exit polls by the Associated Press, Trump's strength in Tennessee came from a 69% showing among Southern whites, who made up 84% of the electorate. Similarly, Trump carried white born-again/Evangelical Christians by 86%–12%. The state of Tennessee is entirely covered in the Bible Belt. The only strength Biden showed was 88% of African-American voters. 65% of voters opposed removing Confederate statues from public places in Tennessee, and these voters backed Trump by 83%–15%.

Primary elections

Republican primary 
The Republican primary was on March 3, 2020. Former Tennessee senator Bob Corker was considered a potential primary opponent for Trump.

Democratic primary 
The Democratic primary was on March 3, 2020. Elizabeth Warren, Bernie Sanders, and former Vice President Joe Biden were among the major declared candidates.

General election

Predictions

Polling 
Graphical summary

Aggregate polls

Polls

Donald Trump vs. Michael Bloomberg

Donald Trump vs. Pete Buttigieg

Donald Trump vs. Bernie Sanders

Donald Trump vs. Elizabeth Warren

Electoral slates 
These slates of electors were nominated by each party in order to vote in the Electoral College should their candidates win the state:

Results

By congressional district 
Trump won 7 of 9 congressional districts.

By county

See also 
 United States presidential elections in Tennessee
 2020 United States presidential election
 2020 Democratic Party presidential primaries
 2020 Republican Party presidential primaries
 2020 Tennessee elections
 2020 United States elections

Notes

References

External links 
 
 
  (State affiliate of the U.S. League of Women Voters)
 

Tennessee
2020
Presidential